Cecidipta teffealis is a species of snout moth in the genus Cecidipta. It was described by Schaus in 1922, and is known from Brazil.

References

Moths described in 1922
Epipaschiinae